Pantelimon I. Sinadino was a Bessarabian politician of Greek descent. He served as mayor of Chișinău in 1837–1839 and 1840–1842, being preceded and succeeded by Dimitrie Lovcinski. Sinadino was the grandfather of Pantelimon V. Sinadino, who also was mayor of Chișinău between 1903–1904, 1905–1907 and 1909–1910.

Bibliography

External links
 Primari ai orașului Chișinău - Departamentul „Memoria Chișinăului” al Bibliotecii Municipale „B.P. Hașdeu”
10+3 primari ai Chișinăului, vipmagazin.md

Mayors of Chișinău
Moldovan people of Greek descent